Yaqubi is a village and union council  in Tehsil Razzar, of the Swabi District, Pakistan. 
The largest village of Swabi is Yarhussain which lies in the north of Yaqubi. Yarhussain is situated on Adena and chota Lahor road. Yaqubi is in the Khyber Pakhtunkhwa province of Pakistan, lying about 25 kilometres  from Mardan and 85 kilometres from the provincial capital of Peshawar.

District Swabi has 4 Tehsils i.e. Swabi Tehsil, Lahor Tehsil, Topi Tehsil and Razar Tehsil. Each Tehsil comprises certain numbers of union councils. There are 56 union councils in district Swabi.

See also 

Swabi District

References

External links
Khyber-Pakhtunkhwa Government website section on Lower Dir
United Nations
 HAJJ website Uploads
PBS paiman.jsi.com

Populated places in Swabi District